Chrysoclista lathamella is a species of moth of the family Agonoxenidae described by Thomas Bainbrigge Fletcher in 1936. It is found in northern Europe (it is not present on the Iberian Peninsula, Balkan Peninsula and Italy).

The wingspan is 11–13 mm. Adults are on wing from June to August.

The larvae feed on willow (Salix species), probably including white willow (S. alba), crack willow (S. fragilis) and pussy willow (S. caprea). They mine the bark of their host plant.

References

External links
 Plant Parasites of Europe

Agonoxeninae
Leaf miners
Moths described in 1936
Moths of Europe